Protein ELYS is a protein that in humans is encoded by the AHCTF1 gene.

See also 
AT-hook

References

External links

Further reading